Amat may refer to:

Names
 Amat (surname), surname of Provençal/Catalan origin
 Amat (name prefix), Arabic female name prefix

People
 Ismail Amat (1935–2018), Uyghur politician of China 
 Zain Amat (born 1975), Singaporean trap shooter

Other uses
 Annie Maunder Astrographic Telescope at the Royal Observatory, Greenwich
 Applied Materials, US semiconductor manufacturing equipment supplier, NASDAQ symbol
 Average memory access time, a performance metric in computer architecture